The Tygertalk is a local newspaper in the Tygerberg region of the City of Cape Town, Western Cape, South Africa. It covers the towns of Bellville and Durbanville.

Weekly newspapers published in South Africa
Mass media in Cape Town
Publications with year of establishment missing